Very Dionne is the fourteenth studio album by American singer Dionne Warwick, released in 1970 on the Scepter label. It was produced by Burt Bacharach and Hal David. It would be her final album recorded with Scepter before signing with Warner Bros. Records.

History
The album is notable for including the single "The Green Grass Starts to Grow".

Track listing

Personnel
Dionne Warwick - vocals
Burt Bacharach, Marty Paich, Larry Wilcox - arrangements, conducting
Armin Steiner, Larry Levine, Michael Wright, Phil Ramone - engineer
Dick Smith - art direction
Harry Langdon - photography

Charts

References

External links
Very Dionne at Discogs

1970 albums
Dionne Warwick albums
albums arranged by Burt Bacharach
albums arranged by Marty Paich
Albums produced by Burt Bacharach
Albums produced by Hal David
Scepter Records albums